Kamar Surakh (also Romanized as Kamar Sūrākh) is a village in Mansuri Rural District, Homeyl District, Eslamabad-e Gharb County, Kermanshah Province, Iran. At the 2006 census, its population was 110, in 25 families.

References 

Populated places in Eslamabad-e Gharb County